This article is part of the history of rail transport by country series

The history of rail transport in Nicaragua began in 1860s, with the first plans for a railway in Nicaragua.  The first line was opened in 1882.  In the past, there were  gauge railways on the Pacific coast, connecting major cities. A private  gauge line operated on the Atlantic coast.

However, as of 2006, there were no longer any trains in Nicaragua. All traffic has been suspended since September 2001, ending several decades of a steady decline.

Beginnings 
For an easier understanding, follow the narrative on a map.

First projects for the construction of railways in Nicaragua were considered in the 1860s. In 1873, the government signed contracts with J. E. Hollembeck & Co. for building a line between Managua and Granada, and with Enrique Meiggs Keith for a line from Corinto to León. However, there were no practical results.

In 1876, President Pedro Joaquín Chamorro Alfaro enacted a decree, calling for a construction of a railway from Corinto via Chinandega and León to the nearest port on Lake Managua (later Western division). The railway would be connected to the capital through steamboats. Another section of railway (later Eastern division) should be built from Managua to Granada via Masaya or along the Tipitapa river.

Works on the Western division started in 1878. The first engine arrived at Chinandega in November 1880, and the first segment – Corinto to Chinadega – was completed and put into operation March 10, 1882. Construction continued and in 1883, the railway reached the city of León and León Viejo, a settlement on the bank of Lago de Managua. A new city, Puerto Momotombo, was inaugurated in 1884 to serve the port and transshipment station. The western division had  of the main line plus  of secondary lines.

The construction of the Eastern division commenced in Nicaragua in 1883. In 1884, the line reached Masaya and the construction was completed in 1886 in Granada. The division had  of main line, plus  of secondary lines.

In 1885, a contract was signed for the construction of Ferrocarril a Los Pueblos de Carazo, branching from the "Eastern division" in Masaya towards Diriamba, across an area of coffee farming.

In 1895-98, a branch Chinandega - El Viejo extended from the Western division.

Twentieth century 

The Central division, connecting the Western and Eastern divisions between La Paz Vieja and Managua, was constructed from 1900 - 1902. This made obsolete the steamboat connection across Lago de Managua and the branch to Puerto Momotombo was abandoned in 1903.

There were plans to extend the network to the Atlantic coast. A contract was signed in 1903. The line should have stretched 288 km from San Miguelito (a port at Lake Nicaragua) through a difficult terrain to Monkey Point at the Caribbean coast. Nicaraguan railways never connected both coasts. Private investors later built an isolated  standard gauge line between Puerto Cabezas and Cocoland. It operated from 1925 until 1955 and was used mainly for a transport of lumber and bananas.

Additional lines on the Pacific coast were built in the subsequent decades. In 1940, the National railways consisted of the following lines:

 Corinto - Granada           191.98 km
 Masaya - Diriamba            43.49 km
 León - El Sauce              72.00 km
 San Jorge - San Juan del Sur 31.00 km
 Chinandega -Puerto Morazán   31.00 km
 El Sauce - Río Grande        13.00 km
Total:                                382.48 km

In the 1960s and 1970s, the railway went into a decline, exacerbated further by the Managua earthquake of 1972. The government reacted to this by constructing a 25.4 km branch from Ceiba Mocha to Puerto Somoza (now Puerto Sandino) in 1976. This significantly increased productive operations and revenues, but did not reverse the long-term trend. Governmental subsidies were steadily increasing and passenger transport declining. The oldest line Corinto - León was abandoned in 1982  when floods damaged tracks. In 1993, there were still 373 km of  narrow gauge tracks in the Pacific region and isolated 3 km of  standard gauge line at Puerto Cabezas in the Caribbean. Several trains a day carried passengers south from Managua to Granada, or north from the capital to León.

Closure 

Most lines were shut down on December 31, 1993 by President Violeta Chamorro who ordered the rolling stock and rail demolished and sold for scrap. The last one - 6 km from Chichigalpa to Ing. S. Antonio - was decommissioned in September 2001.

Future plans
Nicaragua will have railway lines from Managua to Corinto via León and railway lines to San Juan del Sur via Masaya. Feasibility studies are currently being conducted by Yapi Merkezi and Ministry of Transport and Infrastructure.

See also 

History of Nicaragua
Rail transport in Nicaragua

References

External links 

 Historical pictures of Chichigalpa - Ing. S. Antonio line (note: displayed pictures change dynamically; refresh page or switch English/Espaňol to see others)
 Pictures of old train stations in Masaya and Granada

Rail transport in Nicaragua
Nicaragua
Rail
3 ft 6 in gauge railways in Nicaragua

ja:ニカラグアの鉄道#歴史